János Kardos, also known in Slovene as Janoš Kardoš (around February 13, 1801 in Újtölgyes, Kingdom of Hungary, today Noršinci, Slovenia – August 12, 1875 in Őrihodos, Austria-Hungary, today Hodoš, Slovenia) was a Hungarian Slovenian Lutheran priest, teacher, and writer.

He worked and lived in Hodoš, in what was then known as the Slovene March and is today referred to as Prekmurje. After finishing studies in theology in Vienna, he returned to his homeland and wrote and translated several ecclesiastical books and schoolbooks. Kardos was the first to translate works by Hungarian writers and poets from Hungarian into the Prekmurje dialect. Among others, he translated works by Sándor Petőfi, János Arany, Mór Jókai, Sándor Kisfaludy, and Mihály Vörösmarty.

Works 
 D. Luther Martina máli kátekismus ali glavni návuk szvéte vere krsztsanszke (Martin Luther's Little Catechism, or the Main Tenet of the Holy Christian Religion, 1837)
 Krátki návuk krsztsansztva (Little Tenet of Christianity, 1837)
 Mála historia bibliszka ali Sz. Píszma Mêsta prígodna (Little History of the Bible, 1840)
 Krsztsanszke czerkevne peszmi (Christian Hymns, 1848)
 Krsztsanszke mrtvecsne peszmi (Christian Dirges, 1848)
 Mrtvecsne nôve molitvi (New Prayers for the Dead, manuscript 1850)
 Pobo'zne molítvi za poszebno csészt bo'zo (1853)
 Krsztsanszke mrtvecsne peszmi (1855)
 ABC ali Návuk na píszajôcs-cstenyé za szlovenszke vucsevnice vödáni (Primer for Writing and Reading for Slovene Scholars, 1867)
 D. Luther Martina máli kátekismus ali glavni návuk szvéte vere krsztsanszke (1875)
 Krsztsanszke czerkevne peszmi (1875)
 D. Luther Martina Máli kátekismus ali Glávni návuk szvéte vere krsztsanszke (1902)
 Krsztsanszke czerkevne peszmi (1908)
 Toldi: versusko pripovedávanje (Toldi: A Rhyming Narrative, 1921)
 Moses i Josua (Moses and Joshua, 1926–1927), published in the Lutheran periodical Düševni list
 Krsztsanszke mrtvecsne peszmi (1929)
 Evangeliomszke vere ino cérkvi obcsinszki prigodi (1932)

See also
 List of Slovene writers and poets in Hungary

1801 births
1875 deaths
People from the Municipality of Moravske Toplice
Slovenian Lutheran clergy
Slovenian writers and poets in Hungary
Hungarian writers
Hungarian translators
19th-century translators
People from Hodoš